Catholicos Dertad I was the 50th  Catholicos-Patriarch of the Armenian Apostolic Church between 741 and 764.  

According to the historian Kirakos Ganjaketsi, Dertad was from Otmus village and was a 'modest, blessed man, radiant in all virtue'. He reigned in a time of relative peace with a break in the Arab invasions. 

Catholicoi of Armenia
Catholicos Dertad I
Year of birth unknown
8th-century Oriental Orthodox archbishops